Haryana Forestry scam case is a multi-crore fake plantation scam allegedly involving Bhupinder Singh Hooda, Kiran Chaudhary and others where government money was embezzled. In 2009, this scam was exposed by the whistleblower, Sanjiv Chaturvedi, Ramon Magsaysay Award-winner Indian Forest Service officer with then Government of Haryana, who filed a case in September 2012 to seek Supreme Court's instructions to CBI to investigate the case. Earlier, Haryana Government had suspended him in 2007 for acting against illegal felling of trees and poaching in Saraswati Wildlife Sanctuary, but his suspension was revoked by the President in 2008 and the chargesheet was overturned in 2011 on an appeal against the decision of Haryana government. An inquiry committee of the Ministry of Environment & Forest (MoEF) found Chaturvedi's allegations against Haryana government true, preferred an inquiry by Central Vigilance Commission and by CBI into dubious role of certain highly placed politicians and civil servants. CBI, in its reply to CVC, found Chaturvedi's allegations against then Haryana Government creditable enough for an independent inquiry. As per the rules, CBI can not undertake suo motu investigation, only state government, high court or supreme court can ask CBI for it.

There are a total of 6 CBI cases and several other vigilance department investigations against Hooda underway. Central Bureau of Investigation is investigating several scams, mostly related to illegal land grab, that took place during his rule in Haryana. These investigations include the Gurugram-Manesar IMT land scam, Robert Vadra DLF land grab scam, Gurugram Rajiv Gandhi Trust land grab scam, Sonepat-Kharkhoda IMT land scam case, Garhi Sampla Uddar Gagan land scam, Panchkula-HUDA Industrial plots allotment scam, AJL-National Herald Panchkula land grab scam and Haryana Raxil drug purchase scam. He has been already chargesheeted in the Manesar-Gurugram land scam, while other cases are still under investigation (c. March 2018).

Details

Modus of scam
While posted at Fatehbad, the Forests officer Sanjiv Chaturvedi accused the Congress MLA Prahlad Singh Gillakhera of corruption in a herbal park establishment project. He alleged that Gillakhera's relatives were buying rare trees for their personal gardens with the taxpayers' money.

Soon after his suspension, the Haryana Forest Department had started prosecution against the contractors, based on earlier reports filed by him. However, after the NGO Ekta Parishad moved against the accused in the Supreme Court in April 2008, the Hooda Government protected the violators.

Haryana government rejected MoEF's request in 2012 to initiate a CBI inquiry against the forestry scam. Instead Haryana Government issued another charge sheet against Chaturvedi in August 2012, which too was overturned by the President of India. Haryana administration filed a counter case in the High Court to seek cancellation of the presidential order favoring Chaturvedi and also against the formation of MoEF's earlier inquiry committee on this scam on the basis of ultra vires (beyond the powers of President and MoEF). Chaturvedi filed a case in the Supreme Court in September 2012 asking for the CBI inquiry against this scam, where it is still pending (c. March 2018).

Whistle blower, Sanjiv Chaturvedi, harassed by the then UPA administration in several ways, which forced him to move the Uttarakhand High Court, and involve Prime Minister's office.

Current status: Supreme Court
The case is currently in the Supreme Court.

See also
 Corruption in India
 National Herald scam
 Rajiv Gandhi Charitable Trust land grab cases
 Robert Vadra land grab cases
 List of scams in India

References

High Courts of India cases
Cover-ups
Criminal investigation
Corruption in India
Lawsuits
Trials in India
Corruption in Haryana
Supreme Court of India cases
Political corruption in India
Indian National Congress of Haryana
2009 scandals
2010s scandals
2009 in India